Noshir Sheriarji Gowadia (born April 11, 1944) is a former design engineer and convicted spy for several countries. He was arrested in 2005 and later convicted on industrial espionage-related federal charges.

Gowadia was accused of selling classified information to China and to individuals in Germany, Israel, and Switzerland. On August 9, 2010, he was convicted in the United States District Court for the District of Hawaii on 14 of the 17 charges against him. On January 24, 2011, he was sentenced to 32 years in prison.

Early career
Born to a Parsi family in Mumbai, India, he immigrated to the United States and became a naturalized U.S. citizen. He joined Northrop in November 1968, and continued to work there until April 1986.  As a design engineer, Gowadia was reportedly one of the principal designers of the B-2 Spirit stealth bomber, who conceived and conceptually designed the B-2 bomber's entire propulsion system and billed himself as the "father of the technology that protects the B-2 stealth bomber from heat-seeking missiles." In 1999, he founded N.S. Gowadia, Inc., his own consulting company.

Arrest on espionage-related charges
In October 2005, he was interviewed twice by the authorities, and his multimillion-dollar home in Hawaii was searched. Later the same month, he was arrested, and charged with giving secret defense information to unauthorized parties. According to prosecutors, the information mostly related to the B-2 project, and at least eight foreign countries were shown documents relating to the B-2's stealth technology. In an affidavit, Gowadia admitted to transmitting classified information, and stated that he did so "to establish the technological credibility with the potential customers for future business." Gowadia was held without bail after his arrest.

On October 26, 2005, Gowadia was arrested and charged with one count of "willfully communicating delivering or transmitting national defense information to a person not entitled to receive it, which information the possessor has reason to believe could be used to the injury of the United States or to the advantage of a foreign nation" in the United States District Court for the District of Hawaii.

On November 8, 2006, a federal grand jury in Honolulu returned an 18-count superseding indictment against Gowadia. According to a press release from the Department of Justice:

Gowadia was also charged with helping to design stealth technology for Chinese missiles, and with money laundering.

Trial
Gowadia's trial was scheduled for July 10, 2007 but received a continuance until February 12, 2008, because Gowadia's new counsel had to be investigated by the United States Department of Justice for a security background check to allow him to use classified information as evidence at the trial. It was later reported that the trial had been postponed until October 2008, and then again postponed until January 21, 2009.  A trial date for May 5, 2009 was delayed in order to assess if Gowadia was fit to stand trial on mental health grounds.

In November 2009, defense counsel psychology experts tried to establish that Gowadia suffers from narcissistic personality disorder but U.S. Magistrate Judge Kevin S.C. Chang said in a ruling issued late Friday, November 20, that the testimony of the two defense witnesses — Richard Rogers, a forensic psychology professor at the University of North Texas, and Pablo Stewart, a psychiatry professor at the University of California, San Francisco — was not credible. The defendant's unwillingness to thoroughly consult with his lawyers does not equate with an inability to do so, Chang said. That challenging relationship between the defendant and his lawyers cannot and does not provide the basis to find the defendant incompetent, Chang added. Chief U.S. District Judge Susan Oki Mollway chose to accept Chang's recommendation.

A trial was held in 2010. Opening statements began on April 12, 2010. The trial included 39 days of often technical testimony and lasted nearly four months. The FBI Case Agent, Thatcher Mohajerin, testified for weeks. Closing arguments took place on July 29, 2010. Assistant U.S. Attorney Ken Sorenson represented the government in the case, and defense attorney David Klein represented Gowadia. The jury deliberated for five and a half days before returning a guilty verdict on August 10, 2010. Sorenson, the prosecutor, later won the J. Michael Bradford Award of the National Association of Former United States Attorneys for his work in the case.

Although sentencing was set for November 22, 2010, and though Gowadia could have faced a sentence of life in prison, on January 24, 2011 he was sentenced to 32 years in prison.

Gowadia is currently incarcerated in ADX Florence, with a release date of July 20, 2032.

See also
William Kampiles — a CIA clerk who sold a KH-11 spy satellite manual to the Soviet Union
Robert Hanssen — an FBI agent who sold classified information to the Soviet Union and Russia
Aldrich Ames — a CIA agent who sold classified information to the Soviet Union and Russia
Thomas Patrick Cavanaugh — an aerospace engineer who tried to sell stealth bomber secrets to the Soviet Union

References

External links 
 FBI Press Release

1944 births
Living people
American people of Parsi descent
American aerospace engineers
American people convicted of spying for China
Inmates of ADX Florence
American people of Indian descent
People with narcissistic personality disorder
Naturalized citizens of the United States
Parsi people from Mumbai